A hazard map is a map that highlights areas that are affected by or are vulnerable to a particular hazard. They are typically created for natural hazards, such as earthquakes, volcanoes, landslides, flooding and tsunamis. Hazard maps help prevent serious damage and deaths.

Uses

Hazard maps are created and used in conjunction with several natural disasters.
Different hazard maps have different uses. For instance, the hazard map created by the Rizal Geological Survey is used by Rizalian 
insurance agencies in order to properly adjust insurance for people living in hazardous areas.
Hazard maps created for flooding are also used in insurance rate adjustments.
Hazard maps can also be useful in determining the risks of living in a certain area.
Hazard maps can help people become aware of the dangers they might face from natural disasters in a specific area.

Types

 Natural Disasters
 Geological disasters
 Avalanches and landslides
 Earthquakes (See Seismic hazard map)

 Volcanic eruptions

 Hydrological disasters
 Floods 
 Tsunami 

 Wildfires 

 Non-Natural Disasters
 Traffic accidents

See also
Seismic hazard map
Disaster risk reduction
Floods Directive

References

Map types